Police Story is a 1996 Kannada action film, directed by Thriller Manju, starring Sai Kumar as a super cop. The film was simultaneously dubbed into Telugu and Tamil under the same name and in Hindi as Agni IPS, emerged as a blockbuster, and remained a cult classic which lead to two sequels, Police Story 2 in 2007 and Police Story 3 in 2011.

Plot
Agni (Saikumar) is a sincere, short-tempered police officer who could not tolerate injustice and uses brute force to punish criminals. His unconventional methods has been criticised by ministers. In a fit of rage, Agni resigns from the posting, however, he rejoins after being coaxed by his elder brother (Avinash). A new CBI officer (Raymond De Souza) from Mumbai has been appointed to handle a case of a gangster named Black Tiger. The Senior official explains that there used to be a dreaded criminal Shobraj (Shobraj), who killed all the police officials after his wife was molested and killed by his enemy, In the process, Shobraj dies in an explosion.

Two gangsters Sathya (Satya Prakash) and Dharma (Sharath Lohitashwa) terrorise Bangalore with their unlawful activities. Dharma, being a gangster in college, murders a girl by throwing her off a building after she rejects his love. The student who was in love with that girl turns insane and becomes a witness, however, he is killed by Sathya. With this, Agni clashes with Sathya and Dharma. The CBI officer from Mumbai gets killed by a corrupt minister, who is the right hand of Sathya. Agni's brother dies while trashing Black Tiger's henchman Black Cobra in a fit of rage. It turns out that Shobraj is not dead, he is alive under the pseudonym "Black Tiger". The Corrupt inspector kills another inspector to destroy evidence behind the CBI officer's death, who  is killed after getting hit by a truck.

In order to provide justice, Agni brings a mute youngster as a witness to this case, however, Sathya shoots him in the court premises, Agni shoots Sathya and points his gun towards Dharma, who out of fear accepts his wrongdoings. It turned out that before the court case, the judge who was handling this case killed the mute youngster in the hospital and the photos were captured by a journalist. Towards the end, Agni arrests Black Tiger and his efforts have been appreciated by the Chief Minister.

Cast
Sai Kumar as Agni
P. J. Sarma
 Satya Prakash as Sathya
Sharath Lohitashwa as Dharma
Shobaraj as Shobraj alias Black Tiger
Avinash as Agni's brother 
Sudheer
Raymond De'Souza as Mumbai CBI Officer
Rockline Venkatesh as Vijay, Agni's colleague and friend
Sathyajith

Production
Saikumar who gained recognition as a star with Lockup Death (1994) acted in this film under the direction of Thriller Manju, a stunt choreographer who made his directorial debut with this film. The Kannada and its dubbed Telugu version were successful and gained a breakthrough for Saikumar and it led to him being typecast in similar roles.

Sequels
A sequel titled Police Story 2 saw Saikumar reprising his role which was released in 2007. The third unrelated film was released in 2011.

See also
Om Namah Sivaya

References

1990s Kannada-language films
1996 films
Fictional portrayals of police departments in India
1990s masala films
Indian action films
1996 directorial debut films
1996 action films